This is a list of cities in Mongolia.

The following table includes cities of more than 7,500 inhabitants. The results are from the census of January 5, 2000 as well as from a population estimation for the end of 2008. If 2008 year data was not accessible, the closest and most reliable data was used and noted by an index.

The population for previous years show the historical significance of population growth and urbanisation throughout Mongolia.

Population data
The higher level administrative unit is the aimag, except for Ulaanbaatar which administrates its own federal district (Nalaikh and Baganuur are administrated by Ulaanbaatar. The numbers of inhabitants relate to the cities proper without surrounding districts.)

Colour key:
 Salmon cells indicate that the population has declined or experienced minimal (<1%) growth.
 Light green cells indicate a growth between 1-2%. 
 Dark Green cells indicate a growth of greater than or equal to 2%.
Notes:

See also 
History of Mongolia
List of historical cities and towns of Mongolia
List of city listings by country

References

External links 
National Statistical Office of Mongolia
Ministry of Health of Mongolia. National Center for Health Development. Health Indicators 2006
City Population - Historical population figures.

Mongolia, List of cities in
 
Cities
Mongolia